Prince Chaturonrasmi, the Prince Chakkrabatradipongse (13 January 1856 - 11 April 1900) was a Prince of Siam (later Thailand). He was a member of Siamese royal family, a son of King Mongkut and Queen Debsirindra and was a younger brother of King Chulalongkorn. He was Minister of Finance from 1886 to 1892.

Ancestors

References 

Thai people of Mon descent
People from Bangkok
Thai male Chao Fa
Children of Mongkut
Chakri dynasty
1856 births
1900 deaths
Thai people of Chinese descent
Thai people of Iranian descent
Ministers of Finance of Thailand
19th-century Chakri dynasty
20th-century Chakri dynasty
Sons of kings